Qalvaz-e Jadid (also Romanized as Qalvaz-e Jadīd; also known as Qalvaz-e ‘Olyā) is a village in Razavar Rural District, in the Central District of Kermanshah County, Kermanshah Province, Iran. At the 2006 census, its population was 23, in 8 families.

References 

Populated places in Kermanshah County